Project Shoal is a java based scalable dynamic clustering framework that provides infrastructure to build fault tolerance, reliability and availability and can be plugged into the GlassFish Application Server.

The framework can be plugged into any product needing clustering and related distributed systems capabilities without tightly binding to a specific communications infrastructure. The framework can be plugged in as an in-process component. The framework will have two broad categories of public APIs, namely, a Client API, and a Group Communication Provider API. 

Some of the Shoal Capabilities are
 Shoal Group Event Notifications
 Distributed State Cache
 Shoal Automated Delegated Recovery Initiation
 Shoal Messaging

References

External links
 Shoal 1.5 Java docs API

Java enterprise platform